Sean Thomas may refer to:

Tom Knox (author), (born 1963) pseudonym for the English author Sean Thomas
Seán Thomas, (died 1999) former manager of the Republic of Ireland national football team
Sean Thomas, guitarist for the Australian band Kisschasy
Sean Thomas, a member of The Heatmakerz

See also
Sean Patrick Thomas, (born 1970) American actor